Craw Ridge is a prominent ridge that trends northeast from Mount Lister along the south side of Lister Glacier, in the Royal Society Range, Victoria Land. It was named by the New Zealand Antarctic Place-Names Committee after D. Craw, a member of a 1980–81 New Zealand Antarctic Research Program geological party that reached  on Mount Lister by way of this ridge.

References
 

Ridges of Victoria Land
Scott Coast